The Union des étudiants juifs de France ("Union of French Jewish students", UEJF) is a French organization whose aim is to assist French Jewish students.

It was founded in 1944 to assist young Jews who came back from concentration camps or, more generally, who had escaped the Holocaust.

The organization is well known in part for its participation in litigation about issues involving antisemitism, as in the case of LICRA v. Yahoo!.

References

External links
 Official site 

Jewish youth organizations
Zionist organizations
Religious organizations based in France
Student organizations in France
Student religious organizations
1944 establishments in France
Student organizations established in 1944
Jews and Judaism in France
Zionism in France